Bartenieff Fundamentals are a set of principles for "corrective body movement" developed by Irmgard Bartenieff, who studied with Rudolf Laban and colleagues in Germany (1925). After coming to the United States in the 1940s and becoming a physical therapist, Bartenieff developed the method in the form of a set of exercises, based on concepts and principles of kinesiological functioning, that can be extended into all types of movement possibilities. Bartenieff in developing this work fused her studies in both Laban movement analysis with Physiotherapeutic principles and the influence of both is a strong component of the Fundamentals.

The Fundamentals are usually taught in the context of, and alongside, other aspects of Laban Movement Analysis and are considered by many to be an expansion of the Body category of this work.

Principles

 Dynamic Alignment
 Breath Support
 Core Support
 Rotary Factor
 Initiation and Sequencing
 Spatial Intent
 Centre of Weight/Weight Transference
 Effort Intent
 Developmental Patterning and its Support for Level Change

Basic Six
There can be many varieties and expansions of Bartenieff Fundamentals, but a group of movement sequences have become known as the Basic Six. Descriptions can be found in various sources but they were originally written down in the Bartenieff's book, Body Movement: Coping with the Environment. In the Basic Six everything is done starting in semi-supine or supine. Additionally to the Basic Six Bartenieff describes variations and elaborations of these exercises which utilise more varied spatial and dynamic qualities and stronger muscular force. All descriptions below only describe one side but usually both sides will be explored.

Peggy Hackney remarks that when she studied with Bartenieff these exercises were not done in isolation but were starting points for more complex creative movement explorations and would be taken off the floor and into space. These exercises were originally devised whilst Bartenieff practiced physiotherapy in a polio ward but they have been adapted and used with a variety of populations and variations are commonly used in Contemporary dance training.

While the Basic Six and their common supplementary/preparatory exercises represent the most codified aspect of the Fundamentals, many variations and additional exercises are taught but not necessarily described in writing but nevertheless form an integral part of the oral transmission of this material.

Preparation

Flexion - Extension; Abduction - Adduction; Internal Rotation - External Rotation 
Consists of the above movements in the shoulder (glenohumeral) joint. The purpose is partly to sensitise the practitioner to the various planes of motion the body is capable as well as engaging movement in the shoulder joint.

Breath Flow Support
Consists of bringing awareness to the way the breath shapes the body's "internal kinesphere" during inhaling and exhaling. This is described generally as growing and shrinking, bulging and hollowing in the sagittal dimension, widening and narrowing in the horizontal dimension and lengthening and shortening in the vertical dimension.

Additionally, voice may be added. Bartienieff describes these sounds as relating to different parts of the spine and trunk and mentions yogic and tantric influences.

Ooo (as in "you) - Reverberates in the pelvis/lower abdomen

Oh - Reverberates around the navel and lower spine

Aah (as in "yoga") - Reverberates in the upper abdomen and lower ribs

Eeh (as in "say") - Reverberates in the middle chest and thoracic spine

Eee (as in "meeting") - Reverberates in the base of the skull"Movement rides on the flow of breath" Be aware of "subtle inner shape changes in the cavities (mouth, chest, abdomen) and fine gradations that occur in different configurations of limbs...and subtleties in phrasing"

Heel Rock / Rocking Preparation / "Rock and Roll"
From a supine position - consists of a rhythmic rocking action of the whole body from the heels. Occurs in the sagittal plane. Although the movement is initiated in the ankles, it will usually progress through the entire body including the head.

Thigh Lift (femoral flexion)

Pre-lift 
From supine. Consists of sliding each foot, one at a time towards the pelvis, whilst maintaining awareness of a connection between the ischial tuberosities (sits-bones) and the heels. Reverse the movement. The spine should not move and will usually need to be actively "grounded" in order to maintain its position.

Lift 
From semi-supine. Consists of lifting the femur up towards the chest, leading from the knee. Maintain the angle of the knee (i.e. the knee should not increase in flexion or extension) during this motion). Reverse and return the foot to the floor. Like the pre-lift the spine will usually need to be actively "grounded".

Pelvic Forward Shift (Sagittal Pelvic Shift)
From semi supine. The pelvis is lifted and brought towards the feet in the sagittal plane. Reverse the movement

Pelvic Lateral Shift
From semi-supine. Lift the pelvis minimally from the floor and shift it laterally. The pelvis should not tilt in the horizontal, vertical or sagittal plane but should simply glide to the left or the right. Reverse back to centre.

This is known to be one of the most complex of the Basic Six. Although the movement of the pelvis appears so simple it requires complex involvement and interaction of the hip-rotators and other muscles. Various movement teachers including Bartenieff, Martha Eddy and Robert Ellis Dunn have commented that unidimensional movement is actually much harder to produce that three dimensional or planar movement.

Body Half
From supine. Lie in a big "X" position with the legs and arms abducted. Bring the knee and elbow together on one side of the body. Reverse by reaching the fingers and toes diagonally aware from the centre. The body stays as close to "flat" in the vertical plane as possible. Bartenieff stressed that it is better to do this minimally but flat than to close the knee and elbow too much and to come out of the plane.

Knee drop (Diagonal Knee Reach) 
From semi supine. Leading with one knee, let the leg externally rotate and drop to one side. The opposite leg will follow this movement.

Although the final shape is very superficially similar to "lumbar twists" in yoga, in the Knee Drop the pelvis will not roll as much and the movement should be fairly passive - gravity does most of the work. And Bartenieff stresses (1980, p. 243) there should be no tension in the abdomen.

Variation: Alternating Knee Drop and Arms 
In this variation the arm on the opposite side of the body is brought into an active diagonal relationship with the leg initiating the Knee Drop.

Arm Circles
From the final position of the Knee Drop. Keeping the hand on the floor the hand traces a circle over the head to the opposite side and continues in the same circle back to its original position. Reverse the movement. The upper body should roll with the hand and the eyes and head follow the movement where possible. The initial movement is initiated in the hand but the reversal is usually initiated in the scapular.

Variation - Diagonal Sit Up 
The circle is made wider and this shifts the body weight into an asymmetrical kneeling position and the arms circle around the body. Reverse the movement.

Supplementary Exercises 
Additionally to the Basic Six, Bartenieff describes (1980, p. 250-259) an additional set of exercises, which are not as frequently taught or considered part of the core canon of the Fundamental.

They are titled: the See Saw - a partnering exercise, preparatory exercise for creeping to standing, the Lower Unit Sequence - walking through hands from quadruped position, condensing from sitting to lying, creeping to standing for locomotion and creeping to stable standing, and sitting to standing to walking - propulsion sequence.

Finally, a number of exercises are frequently taught, but not described in Body Movement (1980) including "X-rolls" (diagonal rolls) and "Xs and Os" (although this is arguably a variation on Preparatory Exercise for Creeping to Standing).

Patterns of Total Body Connectivity

Also known as Developmental Body Organisations, Developmental Movement Patterns and Basic Neurocellular Patterns.

The sequence of these patterns is based on the writings and teaching of Peggy Hackney, a student of Irmgard Bartenieff and Bonnie Bainbridge Cohen. They synthesise principles from the Bartenieff Fundamentals with the Basic Neurocellular Patterns (formally known as the Basic Neurological Patterns) identified by Bainbridge Cohen. The symbols associated with these patterns were developed by Hackney in consultation with Martha Eddy.

Bainbridge Cohen developed these patterns based on her experience as an occupational therapist and her training in Neurodevelopmental Therapy at the Bobath Centre in London and with influence from the writings of Temple Fay. When Bainbridge Cohen developed these patterns there were originally only four described - spinal, homologous, homolateral and contralateral movement - which were compared to the movements of fish, amphibians, reptiles and mammals respectively. Soon navel radiation and breathing were added, followed by mouthing. These six patterns were later subdivided into the vertebrate and Prevertebrate patterns, with the original four being the vertebrates and the newer additions being prevertebrate. Currently Bainbridge Cohen identifies 19 Basic Neurocellular Patterns which include transitional patterns, variations and modifications of the basic patterns.

The prevertebrate patterns are known as:
 Vibration
 Cellular Breathing
 Sponging
 Pulsation
 Navel Radiation
 Mouthing
 Pre-Spinal
The vertebrate patterns are:
 Spinal Yield and Push (skull to tail)
 Spinal Yield and Push (tail to skull)
 Homologous Yield and Push (hands to feet)
 Homologous Yield and Push (feet to hands)
 Homolateral Yield and Push (one hand to one foot)
 Homolateral Yield and Push (one foot to one hand)
 Spinal Reach and Pull (skull to tail)
 Spinal Reach and Pull (tail to skull)
 Homologous Reach and Pull (hands to feet)
 Homologous Reach and Pull (feet to hands)
 Contralateral Reach and Pull (one hand to opposite foot)
 Contralateral Reach and Pull (one foot to opposite hand)

Hackney's adaptation of this material emphasises an earlier, simpler version of the Basic Neurocellular patterns and relates each pattern to the Basic Six as well as other principles within the scope of the Bartenieff Fundamentals and interpretations of their psychophysical qualities.

These patterns, both in Bainbridge Cohen's and Hackney's interpretation, describe a developmental progression which parallels ontogenetic development (i.e. embryo to adult) as well as phylogenetic development (i.e. single celled organism to human).

Breath
Based on the physiological process of respiration and acknowledges both internal (cellular) respiration and external (lung) respiration. In addition to the basic physiological process of breathing, the growing and shrinking of the body through the breath has a significant impact on the musculature of the body and provides a background rhythm to all other activity.The body grows and shrinks as a single undifferentiated mass, as an amoeba, the simplest form of life, the most basic sense of being. The most fundamental movement, lungs and also oxygen in blood flow and saturation of cells (cellular breathing), moves through a rhythm of expanding and condensing. When breath is integrated throughout the body, then all parts of the body will move at least slightly in coordination with the in / out breath rhythm.Use the breath pattern to recuperate and get in touch with one’s own "internal state", with one’s body self, "proprioceptive self", "where you are in the moment", to find your entire body connected through your internal core.

Core-Distal (Navel Radiation) 
Based on the connectivity between the centre of the body, identified as the navel, and the distal ends of the body, identified of the hands, feet, head and tail. This pattern resembles that of starfish and other sea creatures with similar patterns of locomotion.The breath gradually expands outwards connecting the inner core to limbs all 6 limbs (2 hands, 2 feet, head, tail) which reach outward away from center, and back inward toward center, like a starfish or octopus, squid, the core of the body is activated and connected through the midlimbs to the distal ends of limbs.

Head-Tail (Spinal) 
Based on the basic connectivity of the central axis. Includes the vertebral column but also includes the mobility and motility of other axial structures such as the digestive tract and the spinal cord. In the Basic Neurocellular this actually manifests as 2 prevertebral patterns - mouthing and soft-spinal - and four vertebral patterns (see above). Spinal movement has a strong relationship with the horizontal plane and oral/anal rooting."In Spinal movements, for example, we develop rolling, establish the horizontal plane, differentiate the front and back of our bodies, and gain the ability to attend."To turn and twist into "new options", "can help unblock or unstick fixed notions", to find many other possibilities by following one’s own curiosity outwards into the world in flexible, twisting, plastique directions.

Upper-Lower (Homologous) 
Based on differentiation of the upper and lower body. In Hackney's description this is not necessarily a symmetrical relationship, whilst the parallel in the Basic Neurocellular Patterns - Homologous Movement - this is symmetrical. In Upper-Lower patterning the limbs are involved and mostly the upper body functions in mobility and articulation, whilst the lower body functions in stability and locomotion. Has a strong relationship with the saggital plane and reflexes such as the symmetrical tonic lumbar, symmetrical tonic neck, Babkin and Moro reflexes.In homologous movements we develop symmetrical movements such as push-ups and jumping with both feet, establish the saggital plane, differentiate the upper part of our bodies from the lower part of our bodies, and gain the ability to act.The upper and lower body each function as integrated units, with the upper body (rib-cage, shoulder-girdle, arms and hands) works in contrast to the lower body (pelvic girdle, legs and feet), e.g. where the lower body supports and upper body moves as a unit, such as traveling movements of a frog or rabbit.Can be expressive of basic instincts for self survival, status, personal power, being grounded in the search supporting a reach into the environment. To "push through to the goal", linear-directional goals.

Body-half (Homolateral) 
Based on the differentiation of the left and right sides of the bodies. One side of the body stabilised while the other mobilises. Movement usually switches from one side to the other but doesn't cross the midline. In the Basic Neurocellular Patterns this relates to homolateral movement and has a strong affinity with the vertical plane."In homolateral movements we develop assymetrical movements such as crawling on our bellies and hopping on one leg, establish the vertical plane, differentiate the right side of our bodies from the left, and gain the ability to intend.The right and left sides of the body each open / close in contrast to each other, or an entire side steps as a unit in counterbalance with the entire other side, like a reptile or some mammals; often a slower traveling speed (e.g. humans stroll with both hands in pockets) since it is not a reaching pattern (body-half is pushing only, in locomotion with body-half the limbs traveling forward do so just from the impulse of the push, rather than a full reaching out into space).Oppositions, dichotomies, dualisms, polarities, "On the one hand, On the other hand" yes/no, do it/don’t, good/bad, correct/incorrect, simple-clear opposites (NOT complex relationships).

Diagonal (Contralateral) 
Based on the connectivity of an upper limb to an opposite lower limb, or a lower limb to its opposite upper limb. This tends to stimulate movement in spirals and is evident in complex human movement and is the basis of walking."In contralateral movements we develop diagonal movements such as creeping on our hands and forelegs, walking, running and leaping; establish three-dimensional movement; differentiate the diagonal quadrants of our bodies; and gain the ability to integrate our attention, intention and action."The body connects diagonally (top-left to bottom-right etc.) as in the oppositional locomotion of higher mammals emerging when the limb moving forward reaches actively into space, thus connecting back into the pushing leg; contralateral connectivity then can turn into rhythmic flex/extend patterns connecting across opposite limbs. Twisting, curving and spiral patterns often occur when the limbs are leading in diagonals across the body.Expresses the most complex level of evolution, can express integration of dualistic issues in complex ways, interconnected, spiraling, connect across right and left, integrating the analytic verbal side with the spatial symbolic; feeling & form; simultaneous relationships in several complex directions "tying and untying forms in three-dimensional space", "winding in one body area will initiate an unwinding in another to complete the phrase, thus opening space in a new way", conceptualize how phenomena are networked and multifaceted.

See also

 Irmgard Bartenieff
 Rudolf Laban
 Laban Movement Analysis
 Labanotation

References

Further reading

 Bartenieff, I., & Lewis, Dori. (1980). Body Movement; Coping with the Environment. New York: Gordon and Breach (especially pp. 229–262).
 Cohen, B. B. (1989a). The alphabet of movement; primitive reflexes, righting reactions, and equilibrium responses. Part 1. Contact Quarterly. 14 (2): 20–38.
 Cohen, B. B. (1989b). The alphabet of movement; primitive reflexes, righting reactions, and equilibrium responses. Part 2. Contact Quarterly. 14 (3): 23–38.
 Fukuda, T. (1961). Studies on human dynamic postures form the viewpoint of postural reflexes. Acta Oto-Laryngologica. (supplementum) 161: 1-52.
 Hackney, P. (2000) Making Connections Total Body Integration Through Bartenieff Fundamentals. Routledge. 
 Hamburg, J. (1990). Movement efficiency coaching. Movement and Dance Magazine of the Laban Guild, 79 (May), 51–53.
 Kestenberg Amighi, J., Loman, S., Lewis, P., & Sossin, K. M. (1999). The Meaning of Movement; Developmental and Clinical Perspectives of the Kestenberg Movement Profile. Amsterdam: Gordon & Breach.

External links
 Laban/Bartenieff Institute of Movement Studies
 Integrated Movement Studies (Laban/Bartenieff)
 EUROLAB - European Association of Laban/Bartenieff Movement Studies
 EUROLAB Certificate Programs in Laban/Bartenieff Movement Studies
 Laban/Bartenieff & Somatic Studies International
Summary of Bartenieff Fundamentals and Developmental Movement Patterns - Jeffery Longstaff LMA

Laban movement analysis